Boyd Banks (born April 16, 1964) is a Canadian stand-up comedian and actor.

Background 
He was born in Moose Jaw, Saskatchewan and started in the entertainment industry at 17 when he won a contest for Best Stand Up Comedian in Edmonton, Alberta. He then performed as a stand-up comedian for a few years in Vancouver, British Columbia, before moving to Toronto to act.

Banks has appeared in films including Bruiser (2001), Wild Iris (2001), Dawn of the Dead (2004), Phil the Alien (2004), Land of the Dead (2005), Cinderella Man (2005), Diary of the Dead (2007) and Pontypool (2009).

Among his television credits were guest appearances in Due South and Slings and Arrows, and as a member of the repertory cast of the A&E television series, A Nero Wolfe Mystery. He has had recurring roles in The Red Green Show and Little Mosque on the Prairie.

In February 2019, Banks faced criticism following an incident when, during a live television news report on a meeting responding to SiriusXM Canada's controversial plan to rebrand its Canada Laughs channel, he began licking CBC reporter Chris Glover's ear. Banks apologized the following day, calling himself an "idiot" for his behaviour.

Filmography

Television

References

External links

1964 births
Living people
Canadian male film actors
Canadian male television actors
Canadian stand-up comedians
People from Moose Jaw
Male actors from Saskatchewan
Canadian male comedians
20th-century Canadian comedians
20th-century Canadian male actors
21st-century Canadian comedians
21st-century Canadian male actors
Comedians from Saskatchewan